Philip Cornwell (born 5 October 1957) is an English actor, comedian, impressionist and writer. He is part of the Dead Ringers television and radio series, and is the voice of Murdoc Niccals in the virtual band Gorillaz. Cornwell has co-written and performed principal roles in The Glam Metal Detectives and Stella Street.  He also portrayed DJ Dave Clifton from I'm Alan Partridge and Alpha Papa.

Early life and career
Cornwell was born in Leigh-on-Sea, in the County of Essex. He first appeared on TV in 1980 in the BBC youth programme Something Else - Southend as an episode presenter.

He is popularly known for voicing Murdoc Niccals in the virtual band, Gorillaz.
He provided the voices of Mick Jagger and David Bowie for the Steve Wright in the Afternoon show on BBC Radio 1 in the late-1980s and early-1990s. These impersonations - augmented by many others, including the series narrator, Michael Caine - formed the backbone of the BBC TV series Stella Street, written and performed with John Sessions.

In 1996 he performed in a comedy spoof sketch TV advert to The Professionals imitating Martin Shaw's character of Doyle (with the actor Ray Trickett playing Lewis Collins' Bodie) for the release of the Nissan Almera. In 1997 as part of the same advertising campaign he performed another spoof sketch of the 1970s television series The Sweeney.

He played the part of Harry Noakes, Captain of the cockleboat Renown in the TV mini-series Dunkirk.

He has appeared in several films made by the Comic Strip, including the role as Dave Spanker in Detectives on the Edge of a Nervous Breakdown.  He also played Dave Clifton, a local radio DJ on Radio Norwich - a fictional radio station in both series of I'm Alan Partridge.

He also voiced Sir Lancelot and Robin Hood in the animated children's television series King Arthur's Disasters. He was the voice of Gilbert the Alien in the 1980s TV series Get Fresh, which later span off into Gilbert's Fridge, a series starring the character.

He played King Stupid in the CBBC series Stupid!, having replaced Marcus Brigstocke, because the latter was involved in Excuse My French on BBC2. Cornwell also appeared in the Doctor Who episode, "The Fires of Pompeii". In 2010 he presented/hosted the Friday night Euro Lottery draw show on BBC1. In 2011 he did several stand-up comedy gigs as character Switzerland McNaughtiehorse. Cornwell is a supporter of Tottenham Hotspur F.C. and presents the weekly podcast The Spurs Show with Mike Leigh.

In January 2013 he appeared in the ITV comedy drama series Great Night Out as Tonky.

Filmography

Film

Television

Direct-to-video

Web series

Video games

References

External links

1957 births
Living people
English impressionists (entertainers)
English male film actors
English male television actors
English male voice actors
People from Leigh-on-Sea
Male actors from Essex
20th-century English male actors
21st-century English male actors